The dwarf galaxy problem, also known as the missing satellites problem, arises from a mismatch between observed dwarf galaxy numbers and collisionless numerical cosmological simulations that predict the evolution of the distribution of matter in the universe. In simulations, dark matter clusters hierarchically, in ever increasing numbers of halo "blobs" as halos' components' sizes become smaller-and-smaller. However, although there seem to be enough observed normal-sized galaxies to match the simulated distribution of dark matter halos of comparable mass, the number of observed dwarf galaxies is orders of magnitude lower than expected from such simulation.

Context
For example, around 38 dwarf galaxies have been observed in the Local Group, and only around 11 orbiting the Milky Way, yet dark matter simulations predict that there should be around 500 dwarf satellites for the Milky Way alone.

Prospective resolution
There are two main alternatives which may resolve the dwarf galaxy problem: The smaller-sized clumps of dark matter may be unable to obtain or retain the baryonic matter needed to form stars in the first place; or, after they form, dwarf galaxies may be quickly “eaten” by the larger galaxies that they orbit.

Baryonic matter too sparse
One proposal is that the smaller halos do exist but that only a few of them end up becoming visible, because they are unable to acquire enough baryonic matter to form a visible dwarf galaxy. In support of this, in 2007 the Keck telescopes observed eight newly-discovered ultra-faint Milky Way dwarf satellites of which six were around 99.9% dark matter (with a mass-to-light ratio of about 1,000).

Early demise of young dwarfs
The other popular proposed solution is that dwarf galaxies may tend to merge into the galaxies they orbit shortly after star-formation, or to be quickly torn apart and tidally stripped by larger galaxies, due to complicated orbital interactions.

Tidal stripping may also have been part of the problem of detecting dwarf galaxies in the first place: Finding dwarf galaxies is an extremely difficult task, since they tend to have low surface brightness and are highly diffuse – so much so that they are close to blending into background and foreground stars.

See also
Dark galaxy
Cold dark matter
Cuspy halo problem (also known as "the core/cusp problem")
List of unsolved problems in physics

Footnotes

References

External links
 

Dark matter
Galaxies
Large-scale structure of the cosmos
Unsolved problems in physics